Enteromius pleurogramma is a species of ray-finned fish in the genus Enteromius. It is endemic to Ethiopia.

Some authors include it in the straightfin barb (E. paludinosus). But while they are certainly extremely closely related, they appear to be distinct cryptic species.

Footnotes

References

Enteromius
Fish of Lake Tana
Endemic fauna of Ethiopia
Taxa named by George Albert Boulenger
Fish described in 1902